Thiam is a both a surname of West African origin and an element in Chinese given names.

Surname

Origins and statistics
As a surname, Thiam is found among the Fula and Wolof people of Senegal and nearby countries, and originated from a family of goldsmiths. In the modern Fula language and Wolof language orthographies, it is spelled Caam. Thiam is one of a number of older spellings which originated during French colonial rule; others include Tyam, Chiam, and Cham. This surname is spelled Thiam in Senegal, and Cham in the Gambia. The surname originated from Toucouleur or Laobe people, and is found among Pulaar language speakers. It is not authentically Wolof, and only made its way to the Wolof through Wolof mixture.

French government statistics show 508 people with the surname Thiam born in France from 1991 to 2000, 532 from 1981 to 1990, 196 from 1971 to 1980, and 143 in earlier time periods. The 2010 United States Census found 935 people with the surname Thiam, making it the 26,171st-most-common surname in the country. This represented an increase from 494 people (41,522nd-most-common) in the 2000 census. In both censuses, about nine-tenths of the bearers of the surname identified as Black, and roughly two to three percent as White or Asian.

Government officials and politicians
Awa Thiam (born 1936), Senegalese government official in the Ministry of Women and Children
Augustin Thiam (born 1952), Ivorian politician, governor of the Yamoussoukro Autonomous District
Doudou Thiam (1926–1999), Senegalese diplomat and politician
Habib Thiam (1933–2017), Senegalese politician who twice served as prime minister
Safiatou Thiam, Senegalese public health official
Samba Diouldé Thiam, Senegalese legislator and mathematician
Tidjane Thiam (born 1962), Ivorian banker and economic advisor to the Ivorian government

Athletes
Abdou Mbacke Thiam (born 1992), Senegalese footballer in the United States
Abdoul Thiam (born 1976), German footballer
Abdoulaye Thiam (born 1984), Senegalese sabre fencer
Abdoulkader Thiam (born 1998), Mauritanian footballer in France
Amy Mbacké Thiam (born 1976), Senegalese sprinter
Assane Thiam (born 1948), Senegalese basketball player
Brahim Thiam (born 1974), French and Malian footballer
Demba Thiam (born 1998), Senegalese footballer in Italy
Djibril Thiam (born 1986), Senegalese basketball player
Ibrahima Thiam (born 1981), Senegalese footballer in Belgium
Khaly Thiam (born 1994), Senegalese footballer in Bulgaria
Mame Baba Thiam (born 1992), Senegalese footballer in Turkey
Mamadou Thiam (born 1995), Senegalese footballer in England
Mamadou Touré Thiam (born 1992), Senegalese footballer in Israel
Mohamed Thiam (born 1996), Guinean footballer
Nafissatou Thiam (born 1994), Belgian athlete
Oumoul Thiam (born 1990), Senegalese basketball player
Pablo Thiam (born 1974), Guinean footballer
Serigne Abdou Thiam (1995–2016), Qatari footballer of Senegalese descent

Other people
Akon (Aliaume Damala Badara Akon Thiam) (born 1973), American singer and rapper
Jenna Thiam (born 1990), French actress
Iba Der Thiam (born 1937), Senegalese writer and historian
Mor Thiam (born 1941), Senegalese drummer

Given name
Thiam can be a romanisation, based on the pronunciation in different varieties of Chinese, of multiple Chinese characters. Chinese given names frequently consist of two characters, as in the names of all of the people listed below. The character in common in all of the two-character names below means "to increase"; it can be spelled as Thiam based on its pronunciation in Hakka or various Southern Min dialects (including Chaoshan).

Gan Thiam Poh (born 1963), Singaporean opposition politician and businessman
O Thiam Chin (born 1977), Singaporean writer
Tony Tan Lay Thiam (born 1970), Singaporean People's Action Party politician and businessman
Yap Thiam Hien (1913–1989), Indonesian human rights lawyer
Yeow Chai Thiam ( 1953–2016), Malaysian medical doctor and politician

See also
Taluk Thiam, subdistrict in the Phrom Phiram District of Phitsanulok Province, Thailand

References

Senegalese surnames
Gambian surnames
Chinese given names